Bruno Bianchi (26 September 1943, Trieste, Italy – 28 January 1966, Bremen, Germany) was an Italian swimmer who competed in the 1960 Summer Olympics and in the 1964 Summer Olympics.

He died in the Lufthansa Flight 005 crash in Bremen, Germany.

In Trieste the aquatic centre was named to him, called Polo Natatorio Bruno Bianchi.

References

1943 births
1966 deaths
Italian male swimmers
Italian male freestyle swimmers
Mediterranean Games gold medalists for Italy
Mediterranean Games medalists in swimming
Olympic swimmers of Italy
Sportspeople from Trieste
Swimmers at the 1959 Mediterranean Games
Swimmers at the 1960 Summer Olympics
Swimmers at the 1964 Summer Olympics
Victims of aviation accidents or incidents in Germany
Victims of aviation accidents or incidents in 1966
Universiade medalists in swimming
Universiade bronze medalists for Italy
Medalists at the 1963 Summer Universiade